S/2007 S 2 is a natural satellite of Saturn. Its discovery was announced by Scott S. Sheppard, David C. Jewitt, Jan Kleyna, and Brian G. Marsden on May 1, 2007, from observations taken between January 18 and April 19, 2007.
S/2007 S 2 is about 6 kilometres in diameter, and orbits Saturn at an average distance of 16,054,500 kilometres in 759.2 days, at an inclination of 176.65° to the ecliptic, in a retrograde direction and with an eccentricity of 0.237. According to Denk et al. (2018), it is presumably at high risk of colliding with Phoebe in the future.

The moon was once considered lost in 2007 as it was not seen since its discovery. The moon was later recovered and announced in October 2019.

References

 Institute for Astronomy Saturn Satellite Data
 MPEC 2007-J09: S/2007 S 2, S/2007 S 3 May 1, 2007 (discovery and ephemeris)

Norse group
Moons of Saturn
Irregular satellites
Discoveries by Scott S. Sheppard
Astronomical objects discovered in 2007
Moons with a retrograde orbit